Stencil graffiti is a form of graffiti that makes use of stencils made out of paper, cardboard, or other media to create an image or text that is easily reproducible. The desired design is cut out of the selected medium and then the image is transferred to a surface through the use of spray paint or roll-on paint.

The process of stencilling involves applying paint across a stencil to form an image on a surface below. Sometimes multiple layers of stencils are used on the same image to add colours or create the illusion of depth.

Because the stencil stays nearly unchanged throughout its use, it is easier for an artist to replicate what could be a complicated piece - at a high rate when compared to other conventional tagging methods.

History 

Stencil graffiti began in the 1960s. 

French artist Ernest Pignon-Ernest's stencilled silhouette of a nuclear bomb victim was spray painted in the south of France in 1966 (Plateau d'Albion, Vaucluse)

Blek le Rat's first spray painted stencils were seen in Paris in 1981. He was influenced by the graffiti artists of New York City but wanted to create something of his own.

Australian photographer Rennie Ellis documented some of the earliest examples of stencil art to appear in Sydney and Melbourne in his 1985 book The All New Australian Graffiti. In the introduction to the book, Ellis noted that US photographer Charles Gatewood had written to him and sent him photographs of similar stencil graffiti that had recently appeared in New York City, leading Ellis to speculate that:

... unlike our subway-style graffiti, which is nothing more than a copy of a well-established New York tradition, the symbols of Australia and America had originated separately and unknown to each other.

Over the years this form of graffiti has become a worldwide subculture. The members are linked through the Internet and the images spray-painted on the urban canvas they place throughout the world. Many of its members connect through blogs and websites that are specifically built to display works, get feedback on posted works, and receive news of what is going on in the world of stencil graffiti.

Stencil graffiti is illegal in some jurisdictions, and many of the members of this subculture shroud their identities in aliases. Above / Tavar Zawacki, Banksy, Blek le Rat, Vhils, Shepard Fairey and Jef Aérosol are some names that are synonymous with this subculture.

See also 

 Graffiti terminology
 List of stencil artists
 List of street artists
 Street art sculptures
 Street art
 Street installation
 Wheatpaste street art
 Stencil (typeface)

Notes 

 C215:"Stencil History X". C215, 2007. 
 Louis Bou: "Street Art". Instituto Monsa de ediciones, S.A., 2005.  
 BTOY: "BTOY:DY:002". Belio Magazine, S.L, 2007.

References 
 Jinman, Richard,  "Street art moves to a posh new hang-out", The Sydney Morning Herald, Sydney, Australia, April 9, 2007.
 Norman, James, "Graffiti goes upmarket", The Age, Melbourne, Australia, August 16, 2003.
 Reiss, Jon, [Swindle Magazine: Issue 11] May 3, 2008
 Bello, Manuel, ["Shepard Fairey Interview."Interview with Fecal Face] 14 Aug.2007.
 Bello, Manuel ["Blek Le Rat Interview" with Fecal Face] 
 Rogers, Michelle,  "Jef Aerosol", Gadabout Paris, Paris, France, 2008.
C215 Community Service, Criteres ed. 2011

Further reading 

 Manco, Tristan,  Stencil Graffiti, Thames and Hudson, 2002. 

 Smallman, Jake; Nyman, Carl,  Stencil Graffiti Capital: Melbourne, West New York, NJ : Mark Batty Publisher, October 1, 2005. 

Graffiti and unauthorised signage